The 2016–17 season was Crewe Alexandra's 140th season in their history, their 93rd in the English Football League and first back in League Two following relegation the previous season. Along with competing in League Two, the club also participated in the FA Cup, League Cup and Football League Trophy.

The season covers the period from 1 July 2016 to 30 June 2017.

Transfers

Transfers in

Transfers out

Loans in

Loans out

Competitions

Pre-season friendlies

League Two

Result summary

League table

Matches

FA Cup

EFL Cup

EFL Trophy

References

Crewe Alexandra
Crewe Alexandra F.C. seasons